London Hackspace (abbreviated LHS) is a non-profit hackerspace in London, UK, established in 2009. Originally located in Islington, it moved to Hoxton in July 2010, and later to Wembley. In 2012, it was the largest hackerspace in the United Kingdom by membership, with over 1000 paying members.

Founding 
The group held its first meeting at Ye Olde Cheshire Cheese on 10 February 2009.

Organisational status 

London Hackspace became the world's first virtualised non-profit corporation on 27 July 2011 when the members at the AGM voted to use the OneClickOrgs platform to carry out all the procedures of the board of directors.

Facilities 

London hackspace has a wide variety of facilities split across two floors and a large car park, including equipment for electronics, 3D printing, craft, laser cutting, woodwork, metalwork, biology, amateur radio, robotics, and many other things. An incomplete list of equipment can be found on their wiki.

Projects 

 At Maker Faire 2011, members combined an Xbox Kinect and a pair of Tesla Coils to make an Evil Genius Simulator.
 The Nanode, a networked Arduino clone was developed at the space.

Workshops & events 

London Hackspace hosts regular workshops for Biohacking, Lockpicking, Amateur radio and Hacking on OneClickOrgs. Additional irregular workshops cover Arduino programming, Python programming and OpenStreetMap mapping.

There is also a regular Tuesday night social event.

References

External links 

 Homepage
 Wiki
 Event Calendar

Hackerspaces
2009 establishments in England
Computer clubs in the United Kingdom